Lhommeia is a genus of moths in the family Geometridae described by Wehrli in 1939.

Species
Lhommeia aediphlebia Hampson, 1899
Lhommeia biskrara Oberthür, 1885
Lhommeia biskrara bleusei Thierry-Mieg, 1905
Lhommeia biskrara cinnamomaria Rothschild, 1914
Lhommeia biskrara illiturata Warren, 1897
Lhommeia biskrara viridaria Rothschild, 1914
Lhommeia subapicata Warren, 1899

References

Geometridae